Fliegerführer Afrika was part of Luftflotte 2 (Air Fleet 2), one of the primary divisions of the German Luftwaffe in the Second World War.  It operated in the Mediterranean and Libya from 1941–1942. The commanders were Generalmajor Stefan Fröhlich and Generalleutnant Otto Hoffmann von Waldau, who led the German air support to the German Afrika Korps campaign during the winter of 1941–1942.

The aircraft flown by these commanders were a He 111 P-4 (VG+ES), fully equipped (armed with 5 × MG 15 and 1 × MG 17, capacity to load  of bombs in belly and another  under the wings, also exterior fuel tanks).

Commanding officers
 Generalmajor Stefan Fröhlich 24 February 1941 – 10 April 1942
 Generlmajor Theo Osterkamp (acting), April 1942
 General der Flieger Otto Hoffmann von Waldau, 12 April – 30 August 1942
 General der Flieger Hans Seidemann, 30 August 1942 – 31 January 1943
 Generalmajor Walter Hagen, 1 February 1943 – February 1943

Order of battle

Luftflotte 2 (1941–42)
 Fliegerkorps II
 Korpskette X.Fliegerkorps Afrika
 JagdKommando Kreta
 Fliegerführer Afrika (Ägyptenfeldzug)
 Ramcke Parachute Brigade
 Brigade Hermann Göring
 Kampfgruppe Schmid
 Luftwaffe Kommando Südost
 Luftgau Afrika
 Koluft Libyen
 2.(H)/14
 II Seenot-Dienstführer
 15. Seenotkommando (Bengasi)
 16. Seenotkommando (Derna)
 Seenotkommando (Tripoli)
 II Sanitäts-Flugbereitschaft Bengasi

Luftflotte 2 (1942–43)
 Fliegerführer Afrika (Libyen-Tunesien)
 Fliegerführer Tunis
 Fliegerkorps Tunis
 Verbindungsstaffel und Flugbereitschaft der Fliegerkorps Tunis
 Fliegerführer 1 (Nord)
 Fliegerführer 2 (Mitte)
 Fliegerführer 3 (Süd)
 Fliegerführer Gabes
 General der Deutschen Luftwaffe beim Oberkommand der Kgl. Ital. Luftwaffe (Italuft)
 V Squadra Aerea (Italian 5th Air Fleet)
 Bataglione Paracadutisti Libiche Fanti dell'Aria
 Bataglione Paracadutisti Folgore
 Commando Aeronautica Tripolitana
 Settore Centrale Cirenaica
 Settore Est Fuka (Egypt)
 Deutsch-Italienische Panzerarmee/Armata Corazzata Italo-Tedesca (Flak Div.) Kommando (Anti-Air)

References
Notes

External links 
 Flifu Africa

Military history of Germany during World War II
Luftwaffe Fliegerführer
North African campaign
Military units and formations established in 1941
Military units and formations disestablished in 1943